Martin West may refer to:

 Martin West (colonial administrator) (1804–1849), British colonial administrator
 Martin West (actor) (1937–2019), American actor
 Martin Litchfield West (1937–2015), classical scholar
 Martin West (writer), Canadian writer